The 2015 season was Breiðablik's 30th season in Úrvalsdeild and their 10th consecutive season in top-flight of Icelandic Football.

Along with the Úrvalsdeild, the club competed in the Lengjubikarinn and Borgunarbikarinn.

The 2015 season was Arnar Grétarsson's first season as head coach of Breiðablik after being appointed on 8 November 2014.

On 23 April Breiðablik won the Icelandic league cup, Lengjubikarinn, after a 1–0 win against KA. This was their 2nd Lengjubikar title in the last 3 years.

Breiðablik finished the season in second  place in the league only two points behind FH. This earned them a place in the first qualifying round of the 2016–17 Europa League.

First team

Transfers and loans

Transfers In

Transfers Out

Loans in

Loans out

Pre-season

Fótbolti.net Cup
Breiðablik took part in the 2015 Fótbolti.net Cup, a pre-season tournament for clubs outside of Reykjavík. The team played in Group 1 along with ÍA, FH and Þróttur R. Breiðablik topped the group with two wins and a draw.

On 4 February 2015 Breiðablik became Fótbolti.net Cup winners after defeating Stjarnan in the final, 2–1. Arnþór Ari Atlason and Arnór Sveinn Aðalsteinsson scored Breiðablik's goals. This was Breiðablik's third Fótbolti.net Cup in four years, having also won in 2012 and 2013.

Lengjubikarinn
Breiðablik were drawn in Group 1 in the 2015 Lengjubikarinn along with FH, Fylkir, ÍBV, Þróttur R, Víkingur Ó, BÍ/Bolungarvík and HK. Their first game was a 0–0 draw against Fylkir on 20 Feb Breiðablik than defeated ÍBV in the second round 2–0 but as Kristinn Jónsson was illegally used by Breiðablik they lost the game 3–0, Kristinn had assisted the first goal and scored the second. In the third round Breiðablik defeated Þróttur R 3–1 with 2 goals from Ellert and 1 from Arnþór Ari. On 19 March Breiðablik defeated HK in the Kópavog's derby 1–0 with a goal from Oliver. Breiðablik won their third game in a row when they defeated Víkingur Ó. 4–1. In the 6th round Breiðablik won FH 3–0. On 2 April Breiðablik secured their place in the quarter-finals by defeating BÍ/Bolungarvík 4–0.

In the quarter finals Breiðablik defeated Valur 5–1. Höskuldur and Ellert Hreins scored two goals each and Arnþór Ari one.

Breiðablik won Víkingur R in the semi finals on 19 April 1–0. Arnþór Ari scored the winning goal and his 6th goal of the competition.

On 23 April Breiðablik became the Lengjubikarinn champions after a 1–0 win against KA. Ellert Hreins scored the winning goal on the 6th minute and. Breiðablik controlled the game from the first minute and the win was never in doubt.

Úrvalsdeild

League table

Matches

Summary of results

Points breakdown
 Points at home: 26
 Points away from home: 20
 6 Points: Valur, ÍA, Stjarnan, Fjölnir
 4 Points: Keflavík, Leiknir R., Víkingur R., FH
 3 Points: ÍBV
 2 Points: KR
 1 Point: Fylkir
 0 Points:

Borgunarbikarinn
Breiðablik came into the Icelandic cup, Borgunarbikarinn, in the 32nd-finals and were drawn against KFG. KR won the game 1–3. In the 16th-finals the team was drawn against KA. Breiðablik lost the game 1–0 after extra time.

Squad statistics

Goalscorers
Includes all competitive matches.

Appearances
Includes all competitive matches.
Numbers in parentheses are sub appearances

Disciplinary record
Includes all competitive matches.

References

External links
 Breiðablik Official Site
 Blikar.is – Breiðablik Fan Site

Breiðablik UBK seasons
2015 in Icelandic football
Úrvalsdeild karla (football)
Breiðablik UBK
Kópavogur